Inma de Santis (February 24, 1959 – December 21, 1989) was a Spanish film and television actress. She died in Morocco at the age of thirty following an accident while on holiday in the Sahara Desert.

Selected filmography
 Another's Wife (1967)
 The Last Mercenary (1968)
 Goya, a Story of Solitude (1971)
 The Doubt (1972)
 Unmarried Mothers (1975)

References

Bibliography
 Arantxa Aguirre Carballeira. Buñuel, lector de Galdós. Cabildo de Gran Canaria, 2006.

External links

1959 births
1989 deaths
Spanish film actresses
Spanish television actresses
Actresses from Madrid